Baise, or Bose, is the westernmost prefecture-level city of Guangxi, China bordering Vietnam as well as the provinces of Guizhou and Yunnan. The city has a population of 4.3 million, of which 1.4 million live in the urban area.

The name is from Youjiang Zhuang Baksaek, meaning "in, or blocking, a mountain pass". The name Bwzswz is the Zhuang transliteration of the Chinese name.

Geography and climate

Baise is located in western-northwestern Guangxi bordering Qianxinan Buyei and Miao Autonomous Prefecture (Guizhou) to the north, Qujing and Wenshan Zhuang and Miao Autonomous Prefecture of Yunnan to the west, the Vietnamese provinces of Hà Giang and Cao Bằng to the south and southwest, and the Guangxi cities of Hechi to the northeast/east, Nanning to the east, and Chongzuo to the southeast. It is centrally located between three provincial capitals: Nanning, Kunming, and Guiyang.

Baise has a monsoon-influenced, humid subtropical climate (Köppen Cwa), with short, mild, and dry winters, and long, very hot and humid summers. There are 1,706 hours of bright sunshine annually. Significant temperature variation exists in the prefecture; the western parts, with an average elevation surpassing , lie along the southeastern fringes of the Yunnan–Guizhou Plateau, and hold a climate similar to that of central Yunnan, with much more moderate summer temperatures. With monthly percent possible sunshine ranging from 25% in January and February to 49% in August, the city receives 1,706 hours of bright sunshine annually.

History
The name of the city Baise is a Chinese transliteration of its original name in Youjiang Zhuang language, Baksaek, which probably means jammed gap (literally mouth() blocked (saek)). Baise is young by Chinese standards and was founded as a town in 1730. It is the town where Deng Xiaoping, Chen Haoren and other leaders of the Chinese Communist Party organized the Baise Uprising against the Nationalist government on December 11, 1929. The uprising was also named Youjiang Rebellion.

Administration
Baise has 2 districts, 2 County-level city, 7 counties, and 1 autonomous county.

District:
 Youjiang District
 Tianyang District

County-level city:
 Jingxi
 Pingguo

Counties:
 Tiandong County
 Debao County
 Lingyun County
 Napo County
 Leye County
 Xilin County
 Tianlin County

Autonomous County:
 Longlin Various Nationalities Autonomous County

Demographics
Baise's population at the end of 2019 was 4,226,800, 1,383,400 of which live in the urban area. 80% of the population belong to the Zhuang ethnic group. The rest include Han, Yao, Miao, Hui, and other ethnic groups.

 These figures are based on the following official statistics:

Economy
Baise is one of China's most important producers of aluminum with both aluminum ore mining and aluminum product manufacturing. Baise's tropical climate make it a major food producer, especially fruits. Other natural resources include forest products, petroleum, natural gas, copper, and quartz. Baise is also Guangxi's third biggest producer of hydropower with 5 million kilowatts produced annually. Baise is also famous for mangoes .

Tourism
Baise is blessed with beautiful natural scenery. Forested mountains harbor numerous species of plants and animals. The border areas are some of the least developed lands left in China. These features along with unique ethnic minority culture and important historical sites make it a growing tourist destination.

Transportation
 G69 Yinchuan–Baise Expressway
Baise railway station
Baise Bama Airport

References

External links

 Official website 

 
Prefecture-level divisions of Guangxi
Cities in Guangxi